Fantasia X is the eighth extended play by the South Korean boy group Monsta X. It was released by Starship Entertainment and distributed by Kakao M on May 26, 2020. It had seven tracks, with "Fantasia" as the title track.

Background and release
This was Monsta X's first comeback without Wonho, as he left the group on October 31, 2019. It was initially set to be released on May 11 but was postponed to May 26, so that Shownu could recover from his back pain.

The EP was released in four versions.

Critical reception
Taylor Glasby of Clash described Fantasia X as "a distillation of Monsta X's many parts. Light, breezy pop ('Beautiful Night') nestles beside sensual, bassy funk ('It Ain't Over'), the record's middle section reinforced by the commanding brass and EDM of 'Chaotic' and a thumping party track – 'Zone'". 'Stand Up' is "a confession of pain experienced but also a rallying cry to prevail" and "beneath its bouncy, trop-house beats" is a song that "reflects the band's journey through dark places to emerge on the other side".

Listicles

Commercial Performance
The album is certified Platinum in South Korea and has sold 271,263 units as of 2020. The album peaked at number 2 on the weekly Gaon Album Chart, and at number 5 on Billboard'''s World Albums chart.

The title track "Fantasia" peaked at number 117 on the weekly Gaon Digital Chart and on the weekly Billboard World Digital Song Sales chart at number 11. The track "Stand Up" also appeared on the Billboard World Digital Song Sales chart at number 25. It did not appear on the weekly Gaon Digital Chart, though it appeared on its component Gaon Download Chart at number 102, alongside the other five songs on the EP, with "Flow" at 99, "Zone" at 104, "Beautiful Night" at 106, "Chaotic" at 112, and "It Ain't Over" at 115.<ref  It won the song of the week on The Show''.

Track listing

Charts

Album

Weekly charts

Monthly chart

Year-end chart

Songs

Weekly charts

Certification and sales

Accolades

Awards and nominations

Release history

See also
 List of K-pop songs on the Billboard charts
 List of K-pop albums on the Billboard charts
 List of K-pop songs on the World Digital Song Sales chart

Notes

References

2020 EPs
Korean-language EPs
Monsta X EPs
Starship Entertainment EPs